Sabina Sharipova (born 4 September 1994) is an Uzbek former professional tennis player.

Up to date, she has won 15 singles and seven doubles titles on the ITF Circuit. On 5 November 2018, she reached her best singles ranking of world No. 122. On 9 October 2017, she peaked at No. 197 in the doubles rankings.

Playing for Uzbekistan at the Fed Cup, Sharipova has a win–loss record of 20–17.

Grand Slam singles performance timeline

ITF Circuit finals

Singles: 26 (15 titles, 11 runner–ups)

Doubles: 20 (7 titles, 13 runner–ups)

References

External links

 
 
 

1994 births
Living people
Sportspeople from Tashkent
Uzbekistani female tennis players
Asian Games competitors for Uzbekistan
Tennis players at the 2010 Asian Games
Tennis players at the 2014 Asian Games
Tennis players at the 2018 Asian Games
21st-century Uzbekistani women